Theodore Daniel Rath (born November 22, 1983) is an American football coach who is the Vice President of Player Performance for the Philadelphia Eagles of the National Football League (NFL). He has coached on the professional level since 2009.

High School & College
Rath graduated from Dundee High School in Dundee, Michigan, where he was an honor roll student. He played football for the Vikings, and was named second-team all-league, all-county and all-region as a senior, as well as being named defensive MVP of the Monroe County All-Star game. He went on to play collegiately at the University of Toledo, and was a member of the Rockets' 2004 Mid-American Conference championship squad.

After graduating from Toledo, Rath spent one year at Crestwood High School in Dearborn Heights, Michigan, where he served as an assistant football coach and directed the school's speed and strength training. From 2007 to 2009, Rath returned to the University of Toledo as a graduate assistant, focusing on strength and conditioning for athletes in the college's athletic programs. In his final year there, he served as the assistant director of strength and conditioning.

Professional career

Detroit Lions (2009–2015)
In 2009, Rath was hired by the Detroit Lions as part of the staff of new head coach Jim Schwartz. He remained an assistant strength and conditioning coach throughout Schwartz's five years, and remained on the Lions' staff after Schwartz was fired under Jim Caldwell. While with the Lions, Rath helped start the annual Detroit Lions Strength and Conditioning Clinic in 2011, which was a forum for providing, sharing and exchanging information in the strength and conditioning community. He and other members of the Lions staff were dismissed by newly-hired team general manager Mike Quinn following the 2015 season.

Miami Dolphins (2016)
Rath joined the Miami Dolphins as an assistant strength and conditioning coach for newly-hired head coach Adam Gase.

Los Angeles Rams (2017–2019)
New head coach Sean McVay hired Rath to be the strength and conditioning coach for the Los Angeles Rams. In 2018, he was given the title of director of strength training and performance. During the Rams' 36–31 victory over the Seattle Seahawks on November 11, 2018, Rath was recorded by NFL Films shadowing McVay and sometimes pulling his head coach out of the way when referees or game action would come too close. Both McVay and Rath were interviewed for a profile piece called "The Art of the Get Back Coach," which was aired on NFL Films Presents in January 2019. The clip went viral and has been viewed more than 7 million times.

Philadelphia Eagles (2020–present)
On February 7, 2020 the Eagles announced the hiring of Rath as the team’s director of sports performance.

Personal life
Rath is married and has three children.

On March 15, the Ventura County District Attorney announced that Rath was being charged with three counts of misdemeanor sexual battery, to which Rath's attorney issued a plea of not guilty. The charges resulted from an incident in Moorpark, California that occurred in June 2018 involving a female acquaintance. When the charges were made public, the Rams organization released a statement that said, "we are aware of the charges filed against Ted Rath. We take these allegations very seriously. Once the charges were filed, we decided Ted would take a leave of absence from the team as this matter works its way through the justice system." Additionally, a statement was issued to the Associated Press by Rath's attorney, Vicki Podberesky, that read, "Mr. Rath takes these allegations very seriously...Ted is a man who has led a law-abiding life. He is a husband, a father and a dedicated family man. He has the utmost respect for women and would never intentionally act in a manner that was demeaning or otherwise inappropriate. We intend to defend this matter to the fullest extent possible in a court of law, and we believe that after there has been a full vetting of the facts of this case Mr. Rath will be shown to be not guilty of these charges."

Rath's trial was set to begin on May 31, but proceedings did not ultimately start until July 6, 2019. During the trial, Rath's attorneys argued that he had consumed alcohol for the first time since experiencing a stroke-related event in May 2018 and that, combined with medication he was taking at the time, could not have formed any criminal intent from which he touched the plaintiff inappropriately. 
The case was adjudicated over the course of six days, during which former Rams defensive end Ndamukong Suh testified on Rath's behalf. On July 12, 2019, the jury reached its verdict after one hour of deliberation, finding Rath not guilty on all three counts. Soon after, Rath was reinstated by the Rams organization and rejoined the team at training camp at UC Irvine. McVay commented on Rath's return, stating, "I think it was certainly a good learning experience for all of us, and for Ted especially." Rath later resumed his duties with the team.

Notes and references

External links
 Philadelphia Eagles profile

Living people
Amsterdam Admirals coaches
Detroit Lions coaches
Los Angeles Rams coaches
Miami Dolphins coaches
Philadelphia Eagles coaches
1983 births
American football linebackers
Bucknell Bison football coaches
Toledo Rockets football players